The 2019 Tunisian Super Cup was the  14th edition of the Tunisian Super Cup, a football match contested by the winners of the 2017–18 Tunisian Ligue Professionnelle 1 and 2017–18 Tunisian Cup competitions. The match was played on April 1, 2019 at Abdullah bin Khalifa Stadium in Doha, Qatar. between 2017-18 Ligue 1 winners Espérance ST and 5th 2017-18 Ligue 1 CA Bizertin As an alternative to Club Africain 2017–18 Tunisian Cup winners., Esperance won the title for the fourth time in its history in the first edition since 18 years.

Match

Pre-match 
The match was supposed to be played between the 2017–18 Tunisian Ligue Professionnelle 1 champion ES Tunis and the 2017–18 Tunisian Cup champion Club africain, but the match was postponed several times due to the critical financial and administrative situation for Club Africain and finally withdrew from the Super Cup. The second choice was made for the runner-up of the 2017–18 Tunisian Cup, Etoile Sportive du Sahel. The invitation was rejected due to the overcrowding of the calendar. Finally, a solution was reached with the CA Bizertin, one of the sides of the 2017–18 Tunisian Cup semi-finals, which accepted the 2019 Tunisian Super Cup.

Summary

Match details

See also

 2017–18 Tunisian Ligue Professionnelle 1
 2017–18 Tunisian Cup

Notes

References 

Tunisian Super Cup
Supercup